The Brighton Main Line (also known as the South Central Main Line) is a major railway line in the United Kingdom that links Brighton, on the south coast of England, with central London. The line is electrified throughout using the third rail system.

Aside from London and Brighton themselves, the line serves multiple large urban areas along its route, including Redhill, eastern Crawley, Haywards Heath and Burgess Hill. It also serves the major London suburbs of south-west Battersea, Balham, Streatham, Croydon and Purley, as well as London Gatwick Airport  the second-busiest passenger airport in the country.

In addition, the line operates as a "trunk" route for both mainline and suburban services all across Sussex, east Surrey and the southern boroughs of London. Towns such as Sutton, Epsom, Caterham, Reigate, East Grinstead, Eastbourne, Horsham, Hove, Worthing, Littlehampton, Bognor Regis and Chichester do not lie directly on the line, but are instead linked to London by means of a railway line that connects onto the Brighton Main Line.

Route
The Victoria branch is quadruple-track with fast services running on the western pair of tracks and slow services on the eastern pair. Leaving Victoria the branch runs mostly southwestwards until , where it turns to run southeastwards towards . The London Bridge branch starts off running east, but quickly turns southwards just before the first intermediate station and continues approximately south all the way to East Croydon via ; this branch also has four tracks, but with express services using the inner pair of tracks and local services running on the outer pair. The two branches join at Windmill Bridge Junction just north of East Croydon station; the line then continues mostly southwards for the remainder of its route. The track layout south of the junction is the same as that on the Victoria branch (i.e. fast services on the western pair of tracks).

The Redhill line is a continuation of the slow tracks and is used by stopping services via  itself. It is also the only one of the two lines to have a junction with both the North Downs line and the RedhillTonbridge line. The Quarry line, meanwhile, bypasses Redhill by means of the Redhill Tunnel (passing under the line to Tonbridge) and is a continuation of the fast tracks. As such, it has no intermediate stops, although Coulsdon North station existed on the line until 1983.

From there, the line continues south past  and  before the two pairs of tracks merge at Balcombe Tunnel Junction (just north of Balcombe Tunnel itself) and the line reduces to double-track.

Services
Govia Thameslink Railway (GTR), which operates the Southern, Gatwick Express and Thameslink brands, operates the majority of passenger services on the line, including all services to and from the two London Terminals:

On Sundays, only a shuttle service runs between Gatwick Airport and London Victoria.
Services between Three Bridges and Bedford operate 24 hours a day.
 All other GTR services, including those between London Victoria and Gatwick Airport that call at intermediate stations, are branded as Southern.

The only two other train operating companies that operate on the line are:

Bi-directional signalling

A broken-down train in this section causes the most disruption; therefore, to minimise the effects, the line is divided into four sections of bi-directional signalling, which allows trains to cross over and run on the right-hand track (i.e. "the wrong way"). These are:

 Balcombe Tunnel Junction to Copyhold Junction;
 Copyhold Junction to Haywards Heath South Junction (outer tracks only);
 Haywards Heath South Junction to Keymer Junction;
 Keymer Junction to Preston Park station.

At the passing loop through Haywards Heath, the two inner tracks are only signalled bi-directionally south of Haywards Heath station itself, which allows trains to reverse at the station to/from the south. North of the station these tracks can only be used in their respective directions.

History

Original proposals
There were six original proposals to build a railway between London and Brighton. The London and Brighton Railway (L&BR) emerged with an Act of Parliament of 15 July 1837 after a prolonged and expensive battle, with the most direct route, from the London and Croydon Railway (L&CR) at Norwood Junction to Brighton, using the L&CR from Norwood to London Bridge. A condition required by Parliament was that the railway should share its line between Croydon and Redhill with the South Eastern Railway main line to Dover. This clause gave rise to 60 years of disputes between the two companies.

Brighton line

Land use between London and Brighton was largely rural. The line was planned to traverse the North Downs, the Wealden ridge and the South Downs while avoiding steep gradients.

Owing to the difficult terrain and relatively sparse population between Croydon and Brighton, the line by-passed several towns and villages on the London-Brighton road, such as Reigate and Crawley. Even so, it required substantial earthworks, notably through the North Downs at Merstham, with one of the largest cuttings in Britain; seven tunnels (Merstham, Balcombe, Haywards Heath, Clayton and Patcham initially, then Quarry and Redhill which were constructed later); and several embankments.

The line opened in two stages:
12 July 1841: Norwood Junction to Haywards Heath.
21 September 1841: to Brighton.

Branch lines
The branch line from Brighton to Shoreham-by-Sea was finished on 12 May 1840, before the main line, as it did not involve significant civil engineering works (all the materials arrived by sea from mainland Europe). The Newhaven section did not materialise until 1846, when the Brighton – Hastings line was opened by the Brighton Lewes and Hastings Railway.  A few weeks later the L&CR, the L&BR and other railways in Sussex amalgamated to form the London, Brighton and South Coast Railway (LB&SCR).

Lines to Victoria
A branch line from Sydenham to Crystal Palace was opened together with the relocated Palace on 10 June 1854 and extended to Balham and Wandsworth in 1856 by the West End of London & Crystal Palace Railway. It reached Battersea in 1858, and London Victoria in 1860 on opening of the Victoria Station and Pimlico Railway. A connection from Crystal Palace to Norwood Junction had been made in 1857. A cut-off line reducing the distance between East Croydon and Balham opened in 1862.

Quarry line
There were frequent disputes resulting from the companies' sharing of the busy section between East Croydon and Redhill. The LB&SCR owned the section between East Croydon and Coulsdon North, and the SER (later the South Eastern and Chatham Railway) from Coulsdon South to Redhill. Eventually the LB&SCR built the "Quarry Line", a by-pass for express trains between Coulsdon North and Earlswood, avoiding Redhill. It opened on 8 November 1899 (1 April 1900 for passenger trains).

Electrification
The line was the first UK main line to be electrified throughout. The LB&SCR electrified its South London line on 1 December 1909 using an overhead high-tension single-phase system; within three years the line from Victoria to Selhurst railway station was also converted. In 1921 plans were drawn up to extend overhead electrification to Brighton. In 1925 it was extended toward the edge of today's Greater London at Coulsdon North, before being scrapped by the amalgamated operator under the 1923 grouping: Southern Railway which decided to standardise on the third-rail system of the former London and South Western Railway. In 1928/29 the lines began conversion to third-rail operation.

The change to third rail electrification was in place southward to Coulsdon North by 1929 – to Three Bridges in the north of Sussex in July 1932, then reaching Brighton and West Worthing on the coast on 1 January 1933.

The third rail is electrified at 750 V DC, and in the early part of the 21st century had its power supply upgraded for the introduction of Electrostar stock by Southern. Traction current supply is supervised by Lewisham, Selhurst and Brighton electrical control rooms which will be superseded by the Three Bridges ROC.

Accidents
In the Clayton Tunnel rail crash on 25 August 1861, a signaller mistakenly allowed a passenger train into the tunnel before the previous one had cleared it. 23 passengers were killed and 176 injured in the collision. 
On 16 December 1972, two electric multiple unit passenger trains collided at Copyhold Junction, West Sussex after one of the drivers misread signals. Fifteen people were injured.
In the Purley station rail crash on 4 March 1989, an electric multiple unit passed a signal at danger and collided with another just north of Purley station. Part of the front train fell down the embankment, killing five people and injuring 88.

Notes

References

Sources
Bonavia, Michael R. (1987). The history of the Southern Railway London:Unwin Hyman. .
Dawson, Philip, (1921) Report by Sir Philip Dawson on proposed substitution of electric for steam operation for suburban, local and mainline passenger and freight services, London Brighton and South Coast Railway.

Further reading

External links 
 London to Brighton in two minutes – time-lapse video.
 Brighton Main Line 2 website

Transport in the City of Westminster
Transport in the London Borough of Wandsworth
Transport in the London Borough of Lambeth
Transport in the London Borough of Croydon
Rail transport in Surrey
Rail transport in West Sussex
Rail transport in East Sussex
Transport in Brighton and Hove
Airport rail links in London
Railway lines opened in 1841
Railway lines in London
Railway lines in South East England
Standard gauge railways in England
1841 establishments in England